The Government of the Czech Republic, led by Prime Minister Jan Fischer, was a caretaker government established after Mirek Topolánek and his government lost confidence vote in the Chamber of Deputies.

History
Fischer, an independent statistician, was chosen as non-party candidate for the office of Prime Minister. Government ministers were recommended by Civic Democratic Party, Social Democratic Party and Green Party. Christian Democrats firstly supported the idea of establishing a temporary government until the next legislative election takes place. Jiří Čunek, leader of the Christian Democrats, later announced that his party would not nominate any candidate to this government but was willing to support it if they approve the government's programme. Regardless the decision of the presidium of the party, Miroslav Kalousek, Vlasta Parkanová and four other MPs, declared that they support new cabinet. Overally Civic Democrats nominated 6 Ministers and Prime Minister, Social Democrats 8 Ministers and Greens 2 Ministers.

Jan Fischer was named Prime Minister on 9 April 2009. The rest of his cabinet was named on 8 May 2009. According to the Constitution of the Czech Republic, Fischer and his cabinet have to survive confidence vote in the Chamber of Deputies in 30 days.

Government ministers

References

Czech government cabinets
Civic Democratic Party (Czech Republic)
Czech Social Democratic Party
Green Party (Czech Republic)
Coalition governments of the Czech Republic